Isaiah 60 is the sixtieth chapter of the Book of Isaiah in the Hebrew Bible or the Old Testament of the Christian Bible. This book contains the prophecies attributed to the prophet Isaiah, and is one of the Books of the Prophets. Chapters 56–66 are often referred to as Trito-Isaiah. In chapters 60–62, "three magnificent chapters", the prophet "hails the rising sun of Jerusalem’s prosperity".

Text 
The original text was written in Hebrew language. This chapter is divided into 22 verses.

Textual witnesses
Some early manuscripts containing the text of this chapter in Hebrew are of the Masoretic Text tradition, which includes the Codex Cairensis (895), the Petersburg Codex of the Prophets (916), Aleppo Codex (10th century), Codex Leningradensis (1008).

Fragments containing parts of this chapter were found among the Dead Sea Scrolls (3rd century BC or later)
 1QIsaa: complete
 1QIsab: complete
 4QIsah (4Q62): extant: verses 20–22

There is also a translation into Koine Greek known as the Septuagint, made in the last few centuries BCE. Extant ancient manuscripts of the Septuagint version include Codex Vaticanus (B; B; 4th century), Codex Sinaiticus (S; BHK: S; 4th century), Codex Alexandrinus (A; A; 5th century) and Codex Marchalianus (Q; Q; 6th century).

Parashot
The parashah sections listed here are based on the Aleppo Codex. Isaiah 60 is a part of the Consolations (Isaiah 40–66). {S}: closed parashah.
 {S} 60:1-22 {S}

Verse 3
 The Gentiles shall come to your light,
 And kings to the brightness of your rising.
Cross reference: ; Isaiah 11:10; ; ;

Verse 6
 The multitude of camels shall cover your land,
 The dromedaries of Midian and Ephah;
 All those from Sheba shall come;
 They shall bring gold and incense,
 And they shall proclaim the praises of the Lord.
The English Standard Version refers to young camels in place of dromedaries.

Verse 8
Who are these that come flying as a cloud, and as doves to their dove-cotes? 
This and the following verse refer to the ships of the Mediterranean, turning the prophet's focus from the east to the west.

Uses

Music
The King James Version of verses 1–3 from this chapter are cited as texts in the English-language oratorio "Messiah" by George Frideric Handel (HWV 56).

See also
Adoration of the Magi
Christian messianic prophecies
Christianity and Judaism
Nativity of Jesus
Jewish messianism
Messianic prophecies of Jesus
New Covenant, Replacement theology
Related Bible parts: Psalm 72, Isaiah 2, Isaiah 11, Isaiah 43, Isaiah 49, Isaiah 66, Matthew 2

References

Bibliography

External links

Jewish
Isaiah 60: Hebrew with Parallel English

Christian
Isaiah 60 English Translation with Parallel Latin Vulgate
Catholic Encyclopedia: Messiah

Old Testament theology
60
Christian messianism